The Sofia Central Railway Station is the main passenger railway station of Sofia, the capital of Bulgaria, as well as the largest railway station in the country. It is located 1 km north of the city centre after Lavov most, on Marie Louise Boulevard in the immediate proximity of the Central Bus Station Sofia.
It was completely renovated in 2016.

History

The original building of the Sofia Railway Station was opened on 1 August 1888 to serve the Tsaribrod-Sofia-Vakarel line, the first line of the Bulgarian State Railways entirely built by Bulgarian engineers. The building was designed by the architects Antonín Kolář, Václav Prošek and Marinov, and built with the participation of Italian specialists under Bulgarian undertaker Ivan Grozev between 1882 and 1888. It was a one-storey building, 96 m long and 12 m wide, featuring a small clock tower looking towards Vitosha on the façade and a second storey in the western and eastern part. The first station master was Yosif Karapirov. The Sofia Railway Station was renovated and expanded several times. When the Poduyane railway station was constructed in 1948, the Sofia Railway Station was renamed the Central Railway Station.

The old building was completely demolished on 15 April 1974, as the construction of a new Brutalist Central Railway Station had begun in 1971. The station was opened on 6 September 1974, having been designed by the Transproekt company under lead architect Milko Bechev. It has two underground and three overground storeys and 365 premises and was built of mainly white marble.

Between January and July 2004 the Central Railway Station in Sofia had served 2,323,844 passengers, or 11.8% of all in the country's railway network for that period. An average 10,910 people pass through the station daily, as well as an average 166 trains (84 arriving and 82 departing). The station has 30 ticket offices and 5 electronic timetable displays.

Destinations 
The following destinations can be reached directly from Sofia Railway Station:
 Belgrade
 Bucharest
 Istanbul
 Niš
 Thessaloniki

Transport links

Bus

Regional and international bus services are provided at Central Bus Station Sofia, which lies next to Sofia Central Station.

Public transport
 Tramway service: lines 1, 3, 6, 7, 12
 Bus service: lines 60, 74, 77, 78, 82, 85, 101, 213, 214, 285, 305, 404, 413

Metro

Central Railway Metro Station of Sofia Metro (line 2) lies just next to Sofia Central Station.

Taxi

Parking

Airport

Renovations
The Central Railway Station and the square in front of it were essentially renovated and reconstructed in the 2000s under Milan Dobrev and Olympic Stadium Munich-style tensile elements of 4,500 m2 were added. The interior was also considerably modernized. The entire project cost US$3.5 million.

On 22 August 2013 a 56 million leva (~28.6 million euro) renovation contract was signed. The renovation was completed in 2016.

References

External links

See also

 Central Bus Station Sofia
 Trams in Sofia
 Trolleybuses in Sofia
 Public buses in Sofia
 Sofia Public Transport

Railway stations in Sofia
Railway stations opened in 1888